Whole Lotta Woman may refer to:
"Whole Lotta Woman" (Marvin Rainwater song), 1958
"Whole Lotta Woman" (The Contours song), 1961
"Whole Lotta Woman" (Kelly Clarkson song), 2017
"Whole Lotta Rosie", a song by AC/DC, 1977; sometimes mis-remembered as "Whole Lotta Woman", due to its chorus of "You're a whole lotta woman / A whole lotta woman  / Whole lotta Rosie"